Wiswesser line notation (WLN), invented by William J. Wiswesser in 1949, was the first line notation capable of precisely describing complex molecules. It was the basis of ICI Ltd's CROSSBOW database system developed in the late 1960s. WLN allowed for indexing the Chemical Structure Index (CSI) at the Institute for Scientific Information (ISI). It was also the tool used to develop the CAOCI (Commercially Available Organic Chemical Intermediates) database, the datafile from which Accelrys' (successor to MDL) ACD file was developed. WLN is still being extensively used by BARK Information Services.  Descriptions of how to encode molecules as WLN have been published in several books.

Examples 
 1H : 
 2H : ethane
 3H : propane
 1Y : isobutane
 1X : neopentane
 Q1 : methanol
 1R : toluene
 1V1 : acetone
 2O2 : diethyl ether
 1VR : acetophenone
 ZR CVQ : 3-aminobenzoic acid
 QVYZ1R : phenylalanine
 QX2&2&2 : 3-ethylpentan-3-ol
 QVY3&1VQ : 2-propylbutanedioic acid
 L66J BMR& DSWQ IN1&1 : 6-dimethylamino-4-phenylamino-naphthalene-2-sulfonic acid
 QVR-/G 5 : pentachlorobenzoic acid

References

External links 
 http://www.emolecules.com/doc/cheminformatics-101.htm
 Everything Old is New Again: Wiswesser Line Notation (WLN)

Chemical nomenclature
Cheminformatics
Encodings